Pseudodiamesa is a genus of non-biting midges in the subfamily Diamesinae of the bloodworm family Chironomidae.

Species
The genus includes the following species:

 P. arctica (Malloch, 1919)
 P. branickii (Nowicki, 1837)
 P. latistyla Makarchenko, 1989
 P. nivosa (Goetghebuer, 1932)
 P. pertinax (Garrett, 1925)
 P. stackelbergi (Goetghebuer, 1933)

References

Chironomidae